The Duchy of Cleves was a State of the Holy Roman Empire which emerged from the medieval . It was situated in the northern Rhineland on both sides of the Lower Rhine, around its capital Cleves and the towns of Wesel, Kalkar, Xanten, Emmerich, Rees and Duisburg bordering the lands of the Prince-Bishopric of Münster in the east and the Duchy of Brabant in the west. Its history is closely related to that of its southern neighbours: the Duchies of Jülich and Berg, as well as Guelders and the Westphalian county of Mark. The Duchy was archaically known as Cleveland in English.

The duchy's territory roughly covered the present-day German districts of Cleves (northern part), Wesel and the city of Duisburg, as well as adjacent parts of the Limburg, North Brabant and Gelderland provinces in the Netherlands.

History 
In the early 11th century Emperor Henry II entrusted the administration of the Klever Reichswald, a large forested area around the Kaiserpfalz at Nijmegen directly subordinate to the Imperial rule, to local Lower Lorrainian nobles at Geldern and Kleve. A County of Cleves was first mentioned in the 11th century. In 1417, the county became a duchy. Upon the death of Count Johann in 1368, the fief was inherited by his nephew Adolf III of the Marck. Cleves and the Marck were finally ruled in personal union by the House of La Marck after Adolf's elder brother Count Engelbert III had died without issue in 1391. King Sigismund of Germany raised Count Adolph I to the status of a duke and a Prince of the Holy Roman Empire in 1417.

The Cleves-Mark territories became one of the most significant estates of the Lower Rhenish–Westphalian Circle in 1500, rivaled by the Prince-Bishops of Münster. In 1511 John III of La Marck, son of Duke John II of Cleves, by his marriage with Maria inherited the fiefs of Jülich and Berge upon the death of his father-in-law Duke William IV. When John III succeeded his father as Duke of Cleves in 1521, the states of Jülich, Berge, Cleves and Mark formed the United Duchies of Jülich-Cleves-Berg. His daughter Anne of Cleves (1515–1557) even became Queen Consort of England for a few months in 1540, as her brother William, duke since 1539, quarrelled with Emperor Charles V over the possession of Guelders and sought support from King Henry VIII.

When the last duke of Jülich-Cleves-Berge died issueless in 1609, the War of the Jülich succession broke out. The lands were finally divided between the Wittelsbach dukes of Palatinate-Neuburg (Jülich and Berge) and the Margraviate of Brandenburg, who gained Cleves with Mark and Ravensberg according to the 1614 Treaty of Xanten. The Hohenzollern margraves thereby got a first foothold in the Rhineland; however, large parts of the Duchy of Cleves were occupied by the United Provinces until the Franco-Dutch War in 1672. Finally incorporated into Brandenburg-Prussia by the Great Elector Frederick William I of Brandenburg in 1666 and part of the Kingdom of Prussia after 1701, Cleves was occupied by French forces in the Seven Years' War (1757–1762).

In 1795 the Duchy of Cleves west of the Rhine and Wesel was occupied by France, and became part of the French département of the Roer. The rest of the duchy was occupied between 1803 and 1805, and became part of the département of Yssel-Supérieur and the puppet-state Grand Duchy of Berg (after 1811, the département of Lippe). In 1815, after the defeat of Napoleon, the duchy became part of the Prussian Province of Jülich-Cleves-Berg, which merged in the Prussian Rhine Province in 1822. The cities Gennep, Zevenaar, and Huissen became part of the United Kingdom of the Netherlands as a result of the 1815 Congress of Vienna.

Rulers of Cleves

Counts of Cleves

House of Cleves
 1092–1119 Dietrich I
 1119–1147 Arnold I
 1147–1172 Dietrich II
 1172–1188 Dietrich III
 1188–1198 Dietrich IV
 1198–1201 Arnold II
 1201–1260 Dietrich V
 1260–1275 Dietrich VI
 1275–1305 Dietrich VII of Meissen
 1305–1310 Otto I the Peaceable
 1310–1347 Dietrich VIII the Pious
 1347–1368 Johann

House of La Marck
 1368–1394 Adolf III of the Marck
 1394–1448 Adolph I, son of Adolf III

Dukes of Cleves

House of La Marck

 1394–1448 Adolph I, Duke of Cleves
 1448–1481 John I, son of Adolph I
 1481–1521 John II the Pious, son of John I
 1521–1539 John III the Peaceful, son of John II 
 1539–1592 William the Rich, son of John III
 1592–1609 John William, son of William

Notable people
 

Karl Harst, sixteenth-century diplomat

References

External links 

 Edicts of Jülich, Cleves, Berg, Grand Duchy Berg, 1475–1815 (Coll. Scotti) online
 Settlement of Dortmund between Brandenburg and Palatinate-Neuburg and the conflict of succession in Jülich, in full text
 Map of the Duchy of Cleves in 1789

 
Cleves
Lower Rhenish-Westphalian Circle
Former states and territories of North Rhine-Westphalia
History of Gelderland
History of the Rhineland
Medieval Germany
Early Modern history of Germany
Medieval Netherlands
Early Modern Netherlands
Kleve
States and territories established in 1092
States and territories disestablished in 1795
1090s establishments in the Holy Roman Empire
1092 establishments in Europe
1795 disestablishments in the Holy Roman Empire